Pewsey Vale F.C. is a football club based in the village of Pewsey, Wiltshire, England. They play in the Wiltshire Premier League.

History
The club was formed in 1948, although there is evidence of earlier teams in Pewsey including a club named Pewsey Boys in 1921, and a club called Pewsey Y.M. which entered the FA Cup in 1939, 1945 and 1946.

Promoted to the Great Mills League as champions of the Adkey Wiltshire league, Pewsey were one of the first clubs to benefit from the pyramid system by joining the Screwfix League and then Hellenic League Division One West in 2001. The club immediately won promotion to the Premier League after finishing runners up to Hook Norton, before being relegated back to Division One West. After three seasons in the Premier Division, the club were relegated to Division One and after a further year of struggle, at the end of the 2008–9 season the club took the step to drop down to the Wiltshire League in order to rebuild under the stewardship of Adi Holcombe and Lewis Taylor.

The 2009/10 season resulted in the winning of the Wiltshire Premier League Cup. The next season Pewsey Vale successfully applied to join the Wessex League and in the 2010–11 season started playing in Wessex League Division One.

Since the 2000s the team has been eligible for the FA Vase, with their best performances being the three seasons in which they reached the first round proper.

Ground
The club play their home games at the Recreation Ground, Kings Corner, Ball Road, Pewsey, SN9 5BS.

In 1950, the club took up the offer of a lease on part of the village's Recreation Ground but it was not until the early 1980s that a permanent clubhouse was built, unaided by grants and so mainly through the generosity of several local businesses.

The ground was substantially improved with the help of FA grants in the close season of 2002 to meet Hellenic Premier League standards. This included floodlighting, undercover seating for 50 people and hardstanding all round the perimeter of the playing area.

Notable former players
Jon Guthrie (2001–2012): progressed through the youth system at Pewsey Vale before making first-team debut aged 16. Signed professionally at Crewe Alexandra in 2012 and has played for Walsall in League One and for Livingston in the Scottish Premiership. Joined Northampton Town on a two year contract in June 2021.
Murray Fishlock (2007): played in the Football League for Hereford United before finishing his career with Pewsey Vale in 2007.

Records

	Highest League Position: 18th in Hellenic Premier Division, 2003–04
	FA Vase: 1st Round (3): 2003–04, 2005–06, 2006–07

Honours

Wiltshire League Division One

•	Winners (2): 1989–90, 1992–93

Wiltshire Senior Cup

•	Winners (2): 1990–91, 1999–00

Wiltshire League Cup

•	Winners (1): 2009–10

References

External links
Club website

Football clubs in Wiltshire
Hellenic Football League
Wessex Football League
Western Football League
Association football clubs established in 1945
1945 establishments in England
Football clubs in England
Wiltshire Football League